Lilliput may refer to:

Geography
 Lilliput (townland), a townland in County Westmeath, Ireland
 Lilliput, Dorset, a district in the town of Poole in Dorset, United Kingdom
 Lilliput Glacier, the smallest named glacier in the Sierra Nevada of California
 Lilliput Mountain, a mountain on the British Columbia-Alberta border in the Canadian Rockies
 Lilliput Nunataks, three nunataks on the eastern side of Graham Land, Antarctica
 Lilliput, Victoria, a parish in the County of Bogong, Victoria, Australia

Art, entertainment, and media
 Lilliput and Blefuscu, two island nations in Jonathan Swift's novel Gulliver's Travels (1726, amended 1735)

Publications
 Lilliput (magazine), a British art and literature magazine
 Lilliput (play), 1756 play by David Garrick

Brands and enterprises
 Lilliput Lane, British company miniature models of English cottages and scenes
 Lilliput Kidswear, Indian clothing company

Other uses
 Lilliput (actor), actor and writer in Indian TV and film
 Operation Lilliput, part of the Allied offensive in Papua in World War II
 Lilliput,  is a tiny island kingdom in Gulliver's Travels
 Lilliput, a genus of jumping spiders that was renamed to Tanzania in 2008
 Lilliput longarm octopus a small species of octopus, scientific name Macrotritopus Defilippi

See also
 Gulliver's Travels
 
 Liliput (disambiguation)